These are all the international matches played by Pakistan national field hockey team from 1990 to 1999.

Competitive record

Results

1990

1991

1992

1993

1994

1995

1996

1997

1998

1999

Head-t0-head record 

1990s in Pakistani sport
Field hockey in Pakistan